Joe Gispe is a Papua New Guinean rugby league player who represented Papua New Guinea national rugby league team, including in the Rugby League World Cup matches.

Playing career
Gispe played for the Air Niugini club in the Port Moresby Rugby League.

Gispe represented Papua New Guinea in twelve matches between 1988 and 1992.

His son, Brian Gispe, plays for the Rabaul Gurias.

References

Papua New Guinean rugby league players
Papua New Guinea national rugby league team players
Rugby league second-rows
Possibly living people
Year of birth missing